The 2006 IIHF World U18 Championship Division II were a pair of international under-18 ice hockey tournaments run by the International Ice Hockey Federation. The Division II tournaments made up the third level of competition at the 2006 IIHF World U18 Championships. The Group A tournament took place between 2 and 8 April 2006 in Merano, Italy and the Group B tournament took place between 15 and 21 March 2006 in Elektrėnai and Kaunas, Lithuania. Italy and Great Britain won the Group A and Group B tournaments respectively and gained promotion to Division I for the 2007 IIHF World U18 Championships. While Spain finished last in Group A and Iceland last in Group B and were both relegated to Division III for 2007.

Group A tournament
The Group A tournament began on 2 April 2006 in Merano, Italy. Estonia, the Netherlands, Serbia and Montenegro and Spain returned to compete in the Division II competition after missing promotion to Division I at the previous years World Championships. Italy entered the Division II competition after being relegated from Division I and Belgium entered the tournament after gaining promotion from Division III at the 2005 IIHF World U18 Championships.

Italy won the tournament after winning all five of their games and gained promotion back to Division I for the 2007 IIHF World U18 Championships. The Netherlands finished in second place, losing only to Italy and Estonia finished in third. Spain finished in last place after losing all five of their games and were relegated to Division III for the 2007 IIHF World U18 Championships. Ivan Demetz of Italy finished as the top scorer of the tournament with 12 points including three goals and nine assists. Italy's Massimo Camin finished as the tournaments leading goaltender with a save percentage of 97.56.

Standings

Fixtures 
All times local.

Scoring leaders

List shows the top ten ranked skaters sorted by points, then goals.

Leading goaltenders
Only the top five goaltenders, based on save percentage, who have played at least 40% of their team's minutes are included in this list.

Group B tournament
The Group B tournament began on 15 March 2006 in Elektrėnai and Kaunas, Lithuania. Croatia, Iclenad, Lithuania and Mexico all returned to compete in the Division II tournament after missing promotion to Division I at the previous yeard World Championships. Great Britain entered the Division II competition after being relegated from Division I and Australia entered the tournament after gaining promotion from Division III at the 2005 IIHF World U18 Championships.

Great Britain won the tournament after winning all five of their games and gained promotion back to Division I for the 2007 IIHF World U18 Championships. Lithuania finished second after losing only to Great Britain and Australia finished in third place. Iceland finished in last place after losing all five of their games and were relegated to Division III for the 2007 IIHF World U18 Championships. Robert Dowd of Great Britain finished as the top scorer of the tournament with 14 points including six goals and eight assists. Great Britain's Martin Clarkson finished as the tournaments leading goaltender with a save percentage of 94.92.

Standings

Fixtures 
All times local.

Scoring leaders
List shows the top ten ranked skaters sorted by points, then goals.

Leading goaltenders
Only the top five goaltenders, based on save percentage, who have played at least 40% of their team's minutes are included in this list.

References

IIHF World U18 Championship Division II
IIHF World U18 Championship Division II
II
International ice hockey competitions hosted by Italy
International ice hockey competitions hosted by Lithuania
IIHF World U18 Championship Division II